The Mayannur Kavu Sri Kurumba Bagavathy Temple is a Hindu temple located in Mayannur of Thrissur District of Kerala.

The temple is dedicated to Goddess Sri Kurumba Bhagavathi.

References

Hindu temples in Thrissur district